Rustam Beg Bayandur was a Aq Qoyunlu prince, and one of the contesters in 1492–1497 during the dynastic struggle that had erupted following the death of Ya'qub Beg. He was deposed by his cousin Ahmad Beg.

References

Sources 
 
 
 

Aq Qoyunlu rulers
15th-century monarchs in the Middle East
15th-century births
1497 deaths
Leaders ousted by a coup